Philip Damian Power (born 25 July 1967) is an English football manager and former professional player who played in the Football League, as a forward. He was most recently manager at Salford City, and was featured in the BBC documentary, Class of '92: Out of Their League.

Playing career
While playing for Northwich Victoria, he played in the 1984 FA Trophy Final at Wembley Stadium, picking up a winners medal.

He moved to Sliema Wanderers in 1988 and helped them finish 2nd in the Maltese Premier League. He moved to back to England before they played their UEFA Cup first round tie against Victoria București.

During his time with Chorley, he almost signed for AFC Bournemouth, then managed by Harry Redknapp before a leg injury kept him out of action for almost two years.

During his career, he was managed by famous names such as Dario Gradi at Crewe Alexandra, and former Manchester United and Northern Ireland winger Sammy McIlroy at Macclesfield Town, where he again won the FA Trophy in 1996, against his former club Northwich Victoria.

Honours

Player
Northwich Victoria
 FA Trophy: 1983–84

Macclesfield Town
 FA Trophy: 1995–96
 Football Conference: 1994–95, 1996–97

References

Sources

1967 births
Living people
Footballers from Salford
English footballers
Association football forwards
Witton Albion F.C. players
Northwich Victoria F.C. players
Crewe Alexandra F.C. players
Leigh Genesis F.C. players
Players
Barrow A.F.C. players
Chorley F.C. players
Stalybridge Celtic F.C. players
Macclesfield Town F.C. players
Altrincham F.C. players
Radcliffe F.C. players
Bacup Borough F.C. players
F.C. United of Manchester players
English Football League players
Salford City F.C. managers
Northern Premier League managers
English football managers